Aloísio Sinésio Bohn (11 September 1934 – 9 June 2022) was a Brazilian Roman Catholic prelate.

Bohn was born in Brazil and was ordained to the priesthood in 1961. He served as titular bishop of Abbir Germaniciana and auxiliary bishop of the Roman Catholic Archdiocese of Brasilia, Brazil, from 1977 to 1980. He then served as bishop of the Roman Catholic Diocese of Novo Hamburgo, Brazil, from 1980 to 1986 and finally served as bishop of the Roman Catholic Diocese of Santa Cruz do Sul, Brazil from 1986 until his retirement in 2010.

References

External links

1934 births
2022 deaths
Brazilian Roman Catholic bishops
20th-century Roman Catholic titular bishops
20th-century Roman Catholic bishops
21st-century Roman Catholic bishops
People from Rio Grande do Sul